Pemanis is a state constituency in Johor, Malaysia, that is represented in the Johor State Legislative Assembly.

The state constituency was first contested in 2004 and is mandated to return a single Assemblyman to the Johor State Legislative Assembly under the first-past-the-post voting system. , the State Assemblyman for Pemanis is Anuar Abdul Manap from BN-UMNO.

Definition 
The Pemanis constituency contains the polling districts of Pemanis 1, Pemanis 2, Bumbun, Sulir, Pekan Jabi, Tahang Rimau, Jalan Buloh Kasap, Kampong Mengkudu, Kampong Tengah, FELDA Medoi, Kampong Jawa, Gubah and Kampong Abdullah Selatan.

History

Poling districts
According to the gazette issued on 30 March 2018, the Pemanis constituency has a total of 13 polling districts.

Representation history

Election results

References 

Johor state constituencies